Cameron Louis Wells (born September 23, 1988) is an American basketball player for Trefl Sopot of the Polish Basketball League. He played college basketball with The Citadel Bulldogs.

Professional career

Zwolle
In August 2011, Wells signed a one-year contract with Landstede Zwolle of the Dutch Basketball League (DBL). In February 2012, he was selected for Team North of the DBL All-Star Game.

Tübingen
In his second professional season, Wells played with Tigers Tübingen. In the summer of 2013, Wells injured his knee which forced him to sit out the 2013–14 season.

Gießen
In June 2014, Wells signed with the Gießen 46ers of the German second tier ProA. Gießen won the ProA championship and promoted to the Basketball Bundesliga (BBL) in Well's first season.

Wells extended his contract with Gießen for two more years. In the 2016–17 season, he was named captain of the 46ers. Wells was also selected for the BBL All-Star Game, playing in Team International. In June 2017, he was handed a three-month ban for a failed doping test. According to the anti-doping-commission of the German basketball federation, Wells had probably consumed a contaminated dietary supplement.

Varese
On July 11, 2017, Wells was announced by Pallacanestro Varese of the Italian Lega Basket Serie A (LBA).

Würzburg
In the 2018 offseason, Wells signed with S.Oliver Würzburg of the German Bundesliga. With Würzburg, Wells reached the 2019 FIBA Europe Cup Finals where he lost to Dinamo Sassari. Wells served as the Würzburg team captain in 2019-20 and averaged 16.2 points as wells as 5.5 assists per contest in Bundesliga play.

Gravelines 
Wells was signed by French ProA side BCM Gravelines-Dunkerque in June 2020.

Boulazac 
On December 17, 2020, he has signed with Boulazac Basket Dordogne of the French LNB Pro A. Wells averaged 9.3 points and 4 assists per game.

Bayreuth
On June 19, 2021, Wells signed with Medi Bayreuth of the Basketball Bundesliga.

Trefl Sopot
On September 20, 2022, he signed with Trefl Sopot of the Polish Basketball League.

Honours
Landstede Zwolle
DBL All-Star: 2012

Gießen 46ers
ProA: 2014–15
BBL All-Star: 2017

Trefl Sopot
Polish Cup: 2023

References

1988 births
Living people
American expatriate basketball people in France
American expatriate basketball people in Germany
American expatriate basketball people in Italy
American expatriate basketball people in the Netherlands
American men's basketball players
Boulazac Basket Dordogne players
Dutch Basketball League players
Giessen 46ers players
Landstede Hammers players
Medi Bayreuth players
Pallacanestro Varese players
Point guards
s.Oliver Würzburg players
Tigers Tübingen players
The Citadel Bulldogs basketball players
Trefl Sopot players